Teacher's Pet is a 2004 American animated musical comedy film, which serves as the finale of the 2000 television series of the same name created by artist Gary Baseman. Produced by Walt Disney Television Animation and distributed by Buena Vista Pictures, the film was directed by series director Timothy Björklund and written by series creators Bill and Cheri Steinkellner. The film was released theatrically on January 16, 2004, to mostly positive reviews, but flopped at the box office, making only $6.5 million on a $10 million budget.

The film is dedicated to Baseman's dog, Hubcaps, who died while the film was in production.

Plot
For the past year, a dog named Spot has impersonated a boy named Scott and attended school with his master, fourth-grader Leonard Helperman. Leonard wants to spend the summer with his dog, but Spot wants to become a real human boy ("I Wanna Be a Boy"). Leonard's mother, Mrs. Helperman, is invited to compete in the "Teacher of the Year" finals in Sunny Southern Florida. Leonard and Mrs. Helperman borrow an RV from the principal to travel there, but no dogs are allowed. Leonard sadly bids farewell to Spot ("A Boy Needs a Dog") as they depart.

Spot, along with the Helpermans' other pets, Pretty Boy and Mr. Jolly, are left with a pet-sitter. On television, they discover Dr. Ivan Krank, who claims he can turn animals into human beings and who lives in Southern Florida. Determined to meet Krank and become a boy, Spot chases down the RV, disguises himself as Scott, and convinces Mrs. Helperman to travel together. They drive to Florida ("A Whole Bunch of World").

Back at home, Pretty Boy and Mr. Jolly learn that Krank can't actually turn animals into people, but rather into terrifying hybrid creatures. They decide to find Spot and warn him. Pretty Boy assures Mr. Jolly that they can be tough despite their size ("Small But Mighty").

Arriving in Florida, Mrs. Helperman goes directly to the Teacher of the Year finals, and Spot reveals to Leonard his desire to see Krank and become a boy. Leonard and Spot go to Krank's lab, where Krank agrees to turn Spot human. Krank anticipates finally being respected ("I, Ivan Krank") and uses his machine on Spot.

Spot wakes up to find that he is indeed human, but because dogs age faster than humans, he is a fully grown man rather than a boy. Krank wants to capture and exhibit the "dog-man" around the world, but Leonard and Scott break free. Scott uses his dog senses to locate a lost dog and claim a cash reward. Leonard and Scott enjoy a day on the town ("Take the Money and Run").

Scott and Leonard return to the RV to meet Mrs. Helperman, making up a story to explain the disappearance of Scott-the-boy and the appearance of Scott-the-man. Mrs. Helperman invites Scott in for coffee and soon begins to fall for him. Scott considers marrying Leonard's mother so they can all stay together, but Leonard refuses to allow it. Scott leaves Leonard and Mrs. Helperman after an argument ("I'm Moving On").

Pretty Boy and Mr. Jolly arrive in Florida, and help Leonard realize that he should support Scott's dream. Leonard concludes that the only way they can all be together is for him to become Scott's dog. ("A Boy Needs a Dog (Reprise)"), and leaves for Krank's lab. A regretful Scott returns to reconcile with Leonard and follows him.

Krank plans to turn Leonard into a dog and capture Scott to exhibit both of them. Scott arrives at the lab and destroys Krank's machine. In the ensuing chaos, the machine turns Krank into a mouse and Scott back to his original dog form. Leonard and Spot reunite, and Spot decides that he is "Proud to Be a Dog".

Cast

 Nathan Lane as Spot Helperman / Scott Leadready II / Scott Manly-Manning
 Shaun Fleming as Leonard Amadeus Helperman
 Debra Jo Rupp as Mary Lou Moira Angela Darling Helperman
 Kelsey Grammer as Dr. Ivan Krank
 David Ogden Stiers as Mr. Jolly
 Jerry Stiller as Pretty Boy
 Rosalyn Landor as The Blue Fairy
 Paul Reubens as Dennis
 Megan Mullally as Adele
 Wallace Shawn as Principal Crosby Strickler
 Rob Paulsen as Ian Wazselewski
 Estelle Harris as Mrs. Boogin
 Jay Thomas as Barry Anger
 Genie Ann Francis as Marsha / Marcia
 Anthony Geary as John / Juan
 Mae Whitman as Leslie Dunkling
 Lauren Tom as Younghee
 Pamela S. Adlon as Trevor / Taylor / Tyler
 Timothy Stack as Father
 Emma Steinkellner as Little girl
 Ken Swofford as Officer White
 Kevin M. Richardson as Conductor

Production
The film was animated by Walt Disney Television Animation and Toon City. On its story, instead of telling the original Pinocchio story, the filmmakers thought of putting a little twist on the tale, which relates to the theme of the movie: "Be careful what you wish for." Nathan Lane returned to reprise his role as Spot Helperman/Scott Leadready II after working on the musical The Producers. The movie itself serves as the series finale to end the television series.

Music

Original songs performed in the film include:

Release
Teacher's Pet was originally planned for a September 5, 2003 release before getting rescheduled for February 2004. The film was then moved up to January 16, 2004.

About a week before release, Toon Disney aired a four-hour marathon of episodes for viewers to catch up on the series.

Box office
Over its four-day opening weekend, the film made $3.6 million in 2,027 theaters, $1,777 per theater, making it one of the lowest openings in history. By the end of its run, the film had grossed $6.5 million.

Critical reception
On Rotten Tomatoes the film holds an approval rating of 76% based on 74 reviews, with an average rating of 6.52/19. The site's critics consensus reads: "Despite its short running time, Teacher's Pet is a witty and irreverent family film." On Metacritic, which uses a weighted average, the film has a score of 74 out of 100, based on 26 critics, indicating "generally favorable reviews". Audiences polled by CinemaScore gave the film an average grade of "B−" on an A+ to F scale.

Entertainment Weekly gave the film a B−. Google Play gave the film 3.9 out of 5 stars. Common Sense Media gave the film four out of five stars, claiming it to be "Fast, fresh, funny and entertaining for all", but they also give warnings for minor potty humor and violence. There were also some mixed reviews. Adan Cook from Letterboxd.com gave the film 2.5/5 stars, claiming that people should watch the show before they watch the film.

Home media
Teacher's Pet was released June 15, 2004, on VHS and DVD.

Deleted scenes
The deleted scenes are only animatics as they were either incomplete in time for the film or replaced with a different scene.
 "Pretty Boy and Mr. Jolly On the Road": Pretty Boy and Mr. Jolly end up traveling numerous ways to Florida to save Spot and Leonard.
 "NEATO Awards": Spot, Pretty Boy, and Mr. Jolly cheer on Mrs. Helperman as she accepts the award at the "NEATO" awards. Pretty Boy claims that they can't get home on the RV since they're supposed to be home (Mrs. Helperman doesn't realize that they're in Florida also) as Spot quickly figures out a way to get them home.

References

External links

 
 
 
 
 

2004 films
2004 animated films
2000s American animated films
2004 fantasy films
2000s musical comedy films
2000s English-language films
American children's animated comedy films
American children's animated fantasy films
American children's animated musical films
American fantasy comedy films
American musical comedy films
American musical fantasy films
Teacher's Pet (TV series)
Animated films based on animated series
DisneyToon Studios animated films
Films about wish fulfillment
Films set in Cuba
Animated films set in Florida
Disney Television Animation films
2004 comedy films
American television series finales
Films scored by Stephen James Taylor